Furtho is a deserted medieval village and former parish in West Northamptonshire, England. It is now part of Potterspury civil parish.

The origin of the village's name is uncertain: 'before the hill-spur' or 'ford hill-spur' are conjectured.

The nearest towns are Wolverton  to the southeast and Towcester  to the northwest.

Manor
The Domesday Book of 1086 recorded three estates totalling less than four hides, all held of Robert, Count of Mortain. The largest was a manor of two hides that by the 1240s was held by a Walter de Furtho.
In 1452, William Fortho, esquire was resident in Fortho or Furtho. 

The village was depopulated by the Furtho family inclosing its land in the late 16th and early 17th centuries.  In 1572 Thomas Furtho inclosed the demesnes and gave villagers  of land in the common fields in exchange for their plots and for giving up their ancient right of way to Watling Street. In 1621 Edward Furtho died without issue so the Furtho estate passed to his surviving sisters Anne Staunton and Nightingale Mansel. The Stauntons sold their half in 1625 to Sir Robert Banastre. He died in 1649, leaving his estate to his grandson Banastre Maynard, 3rd Baron Maynard, who sold the estate in 1666.

The manor house has been lost but its 15th-century dovecote survives. It was restored in 1917 and 1990. Its present conical roof is 20th-century and the upper stage is only partially complete. It is a Grade II* listed building.

There is a "Furtho Manor Farm" but it is a more modern, red-brick building unconnected with the lost manor house. It is now a guest house.

Parish church

The Church of England parish church of St Bartholomew is partly 12th- and 14th-century, but was mostly rebuilt in 1620. It was last used for worship in 1921, when the ecclesiastical parish was united with that of St Peter's, Potterspury.

St Bartholomew's is now in the care of the Churches Conservation Trust. It is a Grade II* listed building.

Economic and social history
By the 1720s only four houses remained in Furtho, and by the 1830s this had declined to two. Furtho civil parish was united with that of Potterspury in 1951.

References

Sources

External links

Deserted medieval villages in Northamptonshire
Former civil parishes in Northamptonshire
West Northamptonshire District